Donington Park is a motorway service station owned by Moto, near  Kegworth village in the English East Midlands. It is accessed from the M1 motorway by junctions 23a (from the south) and 24 (from the north), and is part of the complex of junctions involving the A42, A453, A50 and A6 roads.

The service area comprises a main building, with car parking to the north, a separate refuelling station to the east and a conservation area and lake to the south. The main building has a central three-story high atrium containing a food court, with flanking three-story wings to west and east containing retail outlets and other facilities on the ground floor, and the rooms of a Travelodge hotel in the upper floors. The main entrance to the building is from the car park to the north, whilst at the south end is an outdoor terrace overlooking the lake.

From a local government perspective, the service station is in the civil parish of Long Whatton and Diseworth, the district of North West Leicestershire and the county of Leicestershire.

Donington Park motorway services opened on 8 July 1999, being originally owned by Granada, which became Moto in 2001. It was one of the first to offer a whole set of non-food shops, similar to an airport, which now has been adopted as standard. The neighbouring airport has far fewer landside facilities for those awaiting arrivals (before check-in).

Gallery

References

External links 
 
 Motorway Man on Newsnight

Commercial buildings completed in 1999
Transport infrastructure completed in 1999
M1 motorway service stations
Moto motorway service stations
Buildings and structures in Leicestershire
Transport in Leicestershire
North West Leicestershire District
1999 establishments in England